Eutrichota is a genus of flies within the family Anthomyiidae.

Species
Species within this genus include:

 Eutrichota aertaica
 Eutrichota affinis
 Eutrichota albidosa
 Eutrichota anderssoni
 Eutrichota anorufa
 Eutrichota apicalis
 Eutrichota arenosa
 Eutrichota assimilis
 Eutrichota atroapicata
 Eutrichota bilobella
 Eutrichota brevirostris
 Eutrichota caduca
 Eutrichota cameroni
 Eutrichota clavata
 Eutrichota connexa
 Eutrichota conscripta
 Eutrichota costalis
 Eutrichota cylindrica
 Eutrichota duplicata
 Eutrichota epiphallica
 Eutrichota fanjingensis
 Eutrichota finitima
 Eutrichota flavicans
 Eutrichota frigida
 Eutrichota fumipennis
 Eutrichota fuscigenua
 Eutrichota fuscipes
 Eutrichota geomyis
 Eutrichota gigas
 Eutrichota gopheri
 Eutrichota hamata
 Eutrichota humeralis
 Eutrichota hymenacra
 Eutrichota impolita
 Eutrichota incompleta
 Eutrichota inornata
 Eutrichota interior
 Eutrichota labradorensis
 Eutrichota lamellata
 Eutrichota leptinophalla
 Eutrichota levipes
 Eutrichota lipsia
 Eutrichota lividiventris
 Eutrichota longimana
 Eutrichota lucescens
 Eutrichota magna
 Eutrichota major
 Eutrichota medicaginis
 Eutrichota megerlei
 Eutrichota melanderi
 Eutrichota nigrifemoralis
 Eutrichota nigrifemur
 Eutrichota nigriscens
 Eutrichota obversa
 Eutrichota occidentalis
 Eutrichota pallidolatigena
 Eutrichota pamirensis
 Eutrichota parafacialis
 Eutrichota parkeri
 Eutrichota partita
 Eutrichota pilimana
 Eutrichota pilimarginata
 Eutrichota praeclara
 Eutrichota praepotens
 Eutrichota processualis
 Eutrichota punctata
 Eutrichota quadrirecta
 Eutrichota schineri
 Eutrichota sclerotacra
 Eutrichota setosa
 Eutrichota shandanensis
 Eutrichota similis
 Eutrichota simillima
 Eutrichota socculata
 Eutrichota spinigerellus
 Eutrichota spinisoides
 Eutrichota spinosissima
 Eutrichota subbilobella
 Eutrichota substriatella
 Eutrichota sylvia
 Eutrichota tarsata
 Eutrichota texana
 Eutrichota triticiperda
 Eutrichota tunicata
 Eutrichota valida
 Eutrichota woodi

References

Anthomyiidae
Schizophora genera